Yizhar Smilansky (27 September 1916 – 21 August 2006), known by his pen name S. Yizhar, was an Israeli writer and politician. Widely regarded as one of the preeminent figures in Israeli literature, he was awarded the Israel Prize in 1959 for fine literature. He was also awarded several other prizes of national distinction. In his political life, Yizhar served in the Knesset under Mapai almost continuously from 1949-1967.

Biography

Yizhar Smilansky was born in Rehovot to a family of writers. His great uncle was Israeli writer Moshe Smilansky. His father, Zev Zass Smilensky, was also a writer. After the end of World War I, the family moved to Tel Aviv where Yizhar attended the Balfour school. The family returned to Rehovot when he was 11. After earning a degree in education from the Beit Hakerem Seminar in Jerusalem, Yizhar taught in Yavniel, Ben Shemen, Hulda, and Rehovot. He served as an intelligence officer in the Israel Defense Forces during the 1948 Arab-Israeli War.

Yizhar married Naomi Wollman in 1942. They had three children, Yisrael (born 1942), Hila (born 1944), and Ze'ev (born 1954).

Literary career
From the end of the 1930s to the 1950s, Yizhar published short novellas, among them Ephraim Goes Back to Alfalfa, On the Edge of the Negev, The Wood on the Hill, A Night Without Shootings, Journey to the Evening's Shores, Midnight Convoy, as well as several collections of short stories. His pen name was given to him by the poet and editor Yitzhak Lamdan, when in 1938 he published Yizhar's first story Ephraim Goes Back to Alfalfa in his literary journal Galleons. From then on, Yizhar signed his works with his pen name.

In 1949, he published the novella Khirbet Khizeh, in which he described the fictional expulsion of Palestinian Arabs from their fictional village by the IDF during the 1948 Arab-Israeli War. It became a best-seller and in 1964 was included in the Israeli high school curriculum. In 1978, a controversy arose after a dramatization of Khirbet Khizeh by director Ram Loevy was aired on Israeli television. Shapira has lamented that, despite the publishing of Yizhar's novella decades earlier, Benny Morris was able, when he published The Birth of the Palestinian Refugee Problem, 1947–1949 in 1988, to announce "himself as the man who had laid bare the original sin of the State of Israel".

In the late 1950s, his massive work Days of Ziklag appeared, comprising two volumes and more than a thousand pages. This work had a powerful impact on changing the outlook for Hebrew prose on the one hand, and "war literature" on the other. 
Although Yizhar remained in the public eye as an outstanding polemicist, he broke his decades-long literary silence only in 1992 with the publication of his novel, Mikdamot (Preliminaries). This was quickly followed by five additional new volumes of prose, both novels and collections of short stories, including Tsalhavim, Etsel Ha-Yam (At Sea), Tsedadiyim (Asides), and Malkomyah Yefehfiyah (Beautiful Malcolmia). His last work, Gilui Eliahu (Discovering Elijah), set in the period of the Yom Kippur War, was published in 1999 and later adapted for the stage. The play won first prize at the Acco Festival of Alternative Israeli Theatre in 2001. Yizhar also wrote stories for children in which he contended with the defining themes of his youth, as in Oran and Ange concerning the Israeli cultivation of citrus fruits; Uncle Moshe's Chariot, a memoir of the character of his famous great uncle Moshe Smilansky; and others.

Academic career
Yizhar was a professor of education at the Hebrew University of Jerusalem. In 1986-7 he was Visiting Writer at the Center for Jewish Studies at Harvard University. He was a lecturer at Levinsky College in Tel Aviv into the late 1990s.

Political career
Yizhar was elected to the first Knesset in 1949, remaining a Knesset member until the 1955 elections. He returned to the Knesset in October 1956 as a replacement for Aharon Becker. In 1965 he defected to David Ben-Gurion's new Rafi party, but resigned from the Knesset on 20 February 1967. He subsequently joined Ben-Gurion's new National List and was given the symbolic 120th place on its list for the 1969 elections.

Literary style
Yizhar's early work was influenced by Uri Nissan Gnessin. His knowledge of Israeli geology, geomorphology, climate, and  flora is evident in his landscape descriptions and his emphasis on the relationship between person and place. Yizhar's use of language is unique. With his long sentences and combination of literary Hebrew and street jargon, he draws the reader into his heroes' stream of consciousness.

Awards
 In 1959, Yizhar was awarded the Israel Prize for his literary merits
 In 1959, he was awarded the Brenner Prize for literature.
 In 1960, he was awarded the Lamdan Prize for children's literature.
 In 1991, he was awarded the Bialik Prize for literature.
 In 2002, he received the annual Israeli EMET Prize for Art, Science and Culture.
 He is also the recipient of the David Ben-Gurion Award.

See also
List of Israel Prize recipients
List of Bialik Prize recipients
Khirbet Khizeh

References

External links
Works of S. Yizhar at the Jewish National and University Library of the Hebrew University of Jerusalem

Elisha Porat, "From the Edge of the North to the Edge of the Negev", essay on the sources of S. Yizhar's work, on the site "Literatura" (in Hebrew)
Joseph Galron-Goldschläger, editor. "S. Yizhar", in Modern Hebrew Literature: a Bio-Bibliographical Lexicon (in Hebrew).
"S. Yizhar" bibliography at the Institute for Translation of Hebrew Literature
"'It is a filthy war, this'" Haaretz  obit by Yitzhak Laor, 25 Aug 2006
Yizhar Smilansky Guardian obituary by Lawrence Joffe, 24 August 2006
 English excerpt from Yizhar's autobiographical novel "Preliminaries"
 Khirbet Khizeh, English translation 

1916 births
2006 deaths
Academic staff of the Hebrew University of Jerusalem
Jews in Mandatory Palestine
Israeli Jews
Jewish novelists
Hebrew-language writers
Brenner Prize recipients
Israel Prize in literature recipients
Israeli male short story writers
Israeli short story writers
Israeli novelists
Mapai politicians
Rafi (political party) politicians
National List politicians
Academic staff of Tel Aviv University
Members of the 1st Knesset (1949–1951)
Members of the 2nd Knesset (1951–1955)
Members of the 3rd Knesset (1955–1959)
Members of the 4th Knesset (1959–1961)
Members of the 5th Knesset (1961–1965)
Members of the 6th Knesset (1965–1969)
20th-century novelists
20th-century short story writers
20th-century male writers
Recipients of Prime Minister's Prize for Hebrew Literary Works